Bacho Kiro High School is a secondary comprehensive school in the town of Pavlikeni in Bulgaria. The school provides education to many students in the whole municipality of Pavlikeni.

History 

In 1919 and 1920, an initiative led by Pencho Penev and Stoyan Stoyanov Uzunov took the first steps before the Regional school inspectorate in the city of Veliko Tarnovo to found a new modern school in Pavlikeni. The new school opened its doors in October, 1920 with two classes, which had a total of 63 students. The first principal was Mrs. Jordanka Nesheva. From November, 1920 Mr. Kr. Ivanov became principal. Over the next few years the school grew in size and popularity and the number of students increased.

From 1938 to 1945, the school was temporarily renamed to Princess Marie Louise.

From 1946 until today, the school is called "Bacho Kiro" after an important and famous revolutionary in Bulgarian history. Bacho Kiro was a local teacher, whose speeches and poetry revealed his patriotism and inspired people that they can achieve independence not only with weapons, but also through words.

In 2010, the school celebrated its 90th anniversary.

External links 
 

Schools in Bulgaria
Buildings and structures in Veliko Tarnovo Province
Educational institutions established in 1920
1920 establishments in Bulgaria